Michael John Standing (born 20 March 1981) is an English former professional footballer who played as a midfielder. Since terminating his playing career, Standing has become an agent for former teammate and long-term friend Gareth Barry. He has also played part-time for his hometown club, Shoreham.

Career

Playing career
Standing started his footballing career with Brighton & Hove Albion and Aston Villa.
After four years at Villa Park, during which time he failed to play for the first team, Standing joined Bradford City.

On 27 May 2004, Standing moved on to Walsall. Over two seasons, Standing made 52 appearances and scored twice.

After trials at Brentford and Colchester United, Standing joined Chesterfield on 18 September 2006, but left soon after, joining Queens Park Rangers on a non-contract basis in January 2007. He had a brief spell with AFC Bournemouth, leaving at the end of the 2006–07 season. He then joined Oxford United on a free transfer prior to the 2007–08 season.

Standing joined Grays Athletic on 21 November 2007, however he was ineligible to play until 1 January 2008 due to the league rulings. He made his debut on New Year's Day in the 4–1 away defeat to Ebbsfleet United. In total, Standing spent only six months at Grays. He was released by the club in the summer of 2008 and signed with Lewes on 21 July 2008. In July 2011 he signed for Shoreham.

Agency
After retiring as a full-time professional player, Standing was appointed by former Aston Villa and Brighton & Hove Albion teammate Gareth Barry as his new agent after parting company with his previous partner Alex Black. Barry explained that he felt appointing Standing was the correct option as the pair were best friends since childhood and his level of trust in him was "100 per cent".

References

External links

1981 births
Living people
English footballers
Aston Villa F.C. players
Bradford City A.F.C. players
Walsall F.C. players
Chesterfield F.C. players
AFC Bournemouth players
Oxford United F.C. players
Grays Athletic F.C. players
Lewes F.C. players
Association football midfielders
English Football League players
National League (English football) players
People from Shoreham-by-Sea
British sports agents
Shoreham F.C. players
Footballers from West Sussex